John T. Snyder is an American artist whose work has appeared in role-playing games.

Career
John T. Snyder is known for his artwork on the Call of Cthulhu role-playing game. He also illustrated the 5th edition cover of the Stormbringer role-playing game. His Dungeons & Dragons work includes Avengers in Lankhmar (1995), Mind Lords of the Last Sea and Defilers and Preservers for Dark Sun (both 1996), Of Ships and the Sea (1997), and The Savage Coast Monstrous Compendium.

References

External links
 John T. Snyder's deviantart page
 

American artists
Living people
Place of birth missing (living people)
Role-playing game artists
Year of birth missing (living people)